Dacryodes nervosa is a tree in the family Burseraceae. The specific epithet  is from the Latin meaning "with nerves", referring to the leaves.

Description
The dark brown bark is smooth to scaly.

Distribution and habitat
Dacryodes nervosa grows naturally in Sumatra, Peninsular Malaysia and Borneo. Its habitat is lowland forest from sea-level to  altitude.

References

nervosa
Trees of Sumatra
Trees of Peninsular Malaysia
Trees of Borneo